Frank Edgar Cornish III (born June 20, 1944 in New Orleans, Louisiana), generally referred to as Frank Cornish Jr., is a former professional American football player who played  defensive tackle for seven seasons for the Chicago Bears, the Cincinnati Bengals, the Miami Dolphins, and the Buffalo Bills. He played in Super Bowl VI with the Dolphins.

Cornish, who played both offensive and defensive tackle in college at Grambling State, was a starter at left offensive tackle for the Jacksonville Sharks of the World Football League (WFL) during the league's inaugural season in 1974.  In a game program for a game between the Sharks and Philadelphia Bell, played on September 11, 1974, Cornish was listed at 6-foot-3, 282 pounds.

Cornish, who battled weight problems throughout his career, was suspended in August 1968 by Bears coach Jim Dooley, after Cornish weighed in at more than 330 pounds.

His son Frank Edgar Cornish IV, generally referred to as Frank Cornish, also played in the NFL. The younger Cornish died of heart disease in his sleep at his home on August 22, 2008. In Super Bowl XXVII, Cornish and his son became the first father-son combination to have appeared in a Super Bowl (he played in Super Bowl VI).

References 

1944 births
Living people
Players of American football from New Orleans
American football defensive tackles
Grambling State Tigers football players
Chicago Bears players
Miami Dolphins players
Buffalo Bills players